The Sheffield Shield (currently known for sponsorship reasons as the Marsh Sheffield Shield) is the domestic first-class cricket competition of Australia. The tournament is contested between teams from the six states of Australia. Sheffield Shield is named after Lord Sheffield.

Prior to the Shield being established, a number of intercolonial matches were played. The Shield, donated by Lord Sheffield, was first contested during the 1892–93 season, between New South Wales, South Australia and Victoria. Queensland was admitted for the 1926–27 season, Western Australia for the 1947–48 season, and Tasmania for the 1977–78 season.

The competition is contested in a double-round-robin format, with each team playing every other team twice, i.e. home and away. Points are awarded based on wins, draws, ties and bonus points for runs and wickets in a team's first 100 batting and bowling overs, with the top two teams playing a final at the end of the season. Regular matches last for four days; the final lasts for five days.

History of Australia cricket 
In 1891–92 the Earl of Sheffield was in Australia as the promoter of the English team led by W. G. Grace. The tour included three Tests played in Melbourne, Sydney and Adelaide.

At the conclusion of the tour, Lord Sheffield donated £150 to the New South Wales Cricket Association to fund a trophy for an annual tournament of intercolonial cricket in Australia.  The three colonies of New South Wales, Victoria and South Australia were already playing each other in ad hoc matches. The new tournament commenced in the summer of 1892–93, mandating home and away fixtures between each colony each season. The three teams competed for the Sheffield Shield, named after its benefactor. A Polish immigrant, Phillip Blashki, won the competition to design the trophy, a  silver shield.

The competition therefore commenced some 15 years after Australia's first Test match.

Sponsorship and name changes
In 1999, the Australian Cricket Board (now Cricket Australia) announced a sponsorship deal which included renaming the Sheffield Shield to the Pura Milk Cup, then to the Pura Cup the following season.  Pura is a brand name of National Foods, a wholly owned subsidiary of the Philippines-based San Miguel Corporation.  The sponsorship increased total annual prize money to A$220,000, with the winners receiving A$75,000 and the runners up A$45,000.

On 16 July 2008 it was announced that Weet-Bix would take over sponsorship of the competition from the start of the 2008–09 season, and that the name would revert to the "Sheffield Shield" or the "Sheffield Shield presented by Weet-Bix". Weet-bix is a cereal biscuit manufactured by Sanitarium Health Food Company.

In the 2019–20 season, Marsh took over the sponsorship for the competition. This followed Marsh & McLennan Companies' acquisition of JLT, which had sponsored the competition since 2017.

Teams
Since 1977–78, all six states of Australia have fielded their own team. There is no team for any of the territories. Details of each team are set out below.

Venues 
Below are the venues that will host Sheffield Shield matches during the 2022-2023 season.

Competition format
Each side has played each other both home and away every season with the following exceptions:
 South Australia had no home game with: Victoria in 1901–02 or 1903–04; either opponent in 1907–08; New South Wales in 1910–11.
 Queensland and South Australia played only once (in South Australia) in 1926–27.
 Western Australia played each team only once from their debut in 1946–47 until 1955–56 inclusive.
 Tasmania played each team only once from their debut in 1977–78 until 1981–82 inclusive.
 In 2019–20 the season was curtailed after nine rounds due to the COVID-19 pandemic.
 The 2020–21 season was heavily affected by COVID-19 lockdowns, with QLD playing 9 games, Tasmania and South Australia 8, and Western Australia, New South Wales and Victoria playing 7 each. Unusually for the Sheffield Shield, Victoria and New South Wales played each other 3 times during the home and away portion of the season.

Where the teams played an unequal number of games, their final points were calculated on a pro-rata basis.

Matches were timeless (i.e. played to an outright result, weather and schedule permitting) up to 1926–27. A 4-day time limit has applied since 1927–28.

Final
Since 1982–83, the top two teams after the home and away rounds have met in a final, played over five days at the home ground of the top-ranked team.  Between 1982-83 and 2017–18, in the event of a draw or tie, the Shield was awarded to the top-ranked team. Since the 2018-19 summer, in the event of a draw or tie, the team which scores more first innings bonus points, based on the system used in regular season matches, wins the Shield. No final was played in 2019–20 due to the COVID-19 pandemic.

Points system
A number of different systems have been used over the years.  Currently, points are awarded for each match during the home and away season according to the following table.

Bonus point example – If after 100 overs the score is 8/350, the batting team would receive 1.5 points, and the bowling side would receive 0.8 points (0.1 for each wicket)
Quotient (team's batting average divided by its bowling average) is used to separate teams which finish on an equal number of points.
Teams can be penalised points for failing to maintain an adequate over rate.
The bonus bowling points were modified for the 2016–17 season. For the 2014–15 and 2015–16 seasons, the bowling team received 0.5 points for taking the 5th, 7th and 9th wickets (a maximum 1.5 points).

Previous systems
 The Shield was initially envisaged as a match-by-match challenge trophy; it was originally determined on 4 January 1893 that it would first be awarded to the winner of the next inter-colonial match (which was, in fact, the fourth of the season), and then would pass in perpetuity to any team which defeated the holder of the trophy; But on 30 January, it was decided instead to award the Shield to the team which won the most intercolonial matches across the season.
 The quotient has been used as a tie-breaker for teams on equal points since 1893–94.
 First innings points were introduced in 1932–33 and used until 1970–71.
 Bonus points for first innings batting and bowling were used from 1971–72 to 1980–81 inclusive. During the first 100 (8-ball) overs of each side's first innings, a maximum of 10 batting bonus points could be attained. They were awarded for every 25 runs scored from 175 to 400 inclusive. A maximum of 5 bowling bonus points were available, initially upon capture of the second, fourth, sixth, eighth and last wickets. This was later changed to wickets 1, 3, 5, 7 and 9 as batting teams often declared when 9 wickets down to deny the bowling side the additional bonus point.

Competition placings
Prior to the introduction of a Final in 1982–83, the team with most points after the home and away rounds was declared the winner. With the introduction of the Final, the top team hosts the second placed team in a five-day match. The visiting team must win the Final to win the championship; the home team wins the championship in the event of a tied or drawn Final. Further details including match scorecards are available at Cricinfo and the Cricket Archive.

1892–93 to 1925–26

1926–27 to 1946–47

1947–48 to 1976–77

1977–78 to present

Player of the Year

The Player of the Year award is announced at the end of each season. Since its inception in 1976 it has been awarded to the best-performed player/s over the season, as determined a panel of judges. Victorian and South Australian batsman Matthew Elliott has won the award the most times, being awarded Player of the Year on three separate occasions.

Records

Individual records

Most matches played

Players representing three states

Six other players have represented three Australian states in top-level cricket, but without playing Sheffield Shield games for all three – Neil Hawke (SA, Tas, WA); Walter McDonald (Qld, Tas, Vic); Percy McDonnell (NSW, Qld, Vic); Karl Quist (NSW, SA, WA); Greg Rowell (NSW, Qld, Tas); Wal Walmsley (NSW, Qld, Tas), Dan Christian (NSW, SA, Vic).

Team records

Team results

Highest team totals

Lowest team totals

Batting records

Highest individual scores

Most career runs

Most runs in a season

Highest batting averages

Most centuries

Bowling records

Most career wickets

Most wickets in a season

Best career average

Hat-tricks
Many bowlers have taken a hat-trick in the Sheffield Shield. Mitchell Starc is the only bowler to take two hat-tricks in a Sheffield Shield match. In round two of the 2017–18 competition, Starc became the first bowler to take a hat-trick in each innings of a first-class cricket match in Australia. He became the second Australian, and the eighth bowler overall, to take a two hat-tricks in each innings of a first-class match. In a match from 4–7 November 2017, New South Wales played against Western Australia at Hurstville Oval. In Western Australia's first innings, Starc dismissed Jason Behrendorff, David Moody and Simon Mackin in consecutive deliveries; in the second innings he dismissed Behrendorff, Moody and Jonathan Wells in consecutive deliveries.

Wicket-keeping records

Most dismissals

Most dismissals in a season

See also

Intercolonial cricket in Australia
Matador BBQs One-Day Cup
KFC T20 Big Bash League
2022–23 Sheffield Shield season

References

The History of the Sheffield Shield, Chris Harte
A Century of Summers: 100 years of Sheffield Shield cricket, Geoff Armstrong
A History of Australian Cricket 1993, Chris Harte

 
Australian domestic cricket competitions
Professional sports leagues in Australia
Recurring sporting events established in 1892
Sports leagues established in 1892
1892 establishments in Australia
First-class cricket competitions